Alberto Del Nero (3 July 1918 – 12 December 1986) was an Italian politician who served as Mayor of Massa (1958–1962), Senator (1968–1983) and Undersecretary of State in four cabinets (1972–1976).

References

1918 births
1986 deaths
Mayors of Massa
People from Massa
Christian Democracy (Italy) politicians
Senators of Legislature V of Italy
Senators of Legislature VI of Italy
Senators of Legislature VII of Italy
Senators of Legislature VIII of Italy
20th-century Italian politicians